KIPP King Collegiate High School is located in San Lorenzo, California. KIPP King was named after Martin Luther King Jr.

References

High schools in Alameda County, California